Christian Bouchet (born 17 January 1955) is a French far-right journalist and politician.

Biography 
Coming from a far-right family with monarchist and Organisation armée secrète links, in 1970 Bouchet joined the monarchist group Restauration nationale, and, in 1971, a member of Nouvelle Action française which was a split (called in France a "Mao-maurrassien" group) of the former.

In 1973, he served the Organisation lutte du peuple, a nationalist revolutionary split of the far-right movement Ordre Nouveau intended to defend the nationalist movements of the Third World, particularly the Arabic states opposite to Zionism and perceived American imperialism. This group was absorbed by Unité Radicale in 1998. He has since gone on to lead the study group Réseau Radical which emphasised anti-Zionism and after that the association Les Nôtres. He has also led the 'radical' tendency within the National Republican Movement and has sat on its national council. Bouchet who was an exponent of the Third Position until 1990, was later influenced by Aleksandr Dugin and advocated National Bolshevism and then Eurasianism.

After declaring to have broken with his former activism, he joined the Front National in 2008 and became a local branch leader from October 2010 to May 2011 and from March 2013 to actually. He was candidate of the Front National for every poll since 2008 and, in 2013, the Front National choose him to lead his list for the municipal elections in Nantes (the 6th town of France). He is the father of Gauthier Bouchet, FN municipal councillor of Saint-Nazaire.

He had published journals like Lutte de Peuple and Résistance which focused on ultra-nationalist and anti-Zionist themes. He owned the publishing house Ars magna and Avatar which published volumes of Savitri Devi, Jean-François Thiriart, Francis Parker Yockey, Gabriele d'Annunzio, Aleksandr Dugin and others.

In the original edition of his book Hitler's Priestess Nicholas Goodrick-Clarke wrote that Bouchet has been associated with Nazi mysticism and that, whilst spending a year in India, he met with Savitri Devi to study Kali Yuga and her ideas about Adolf Hitler as an Avatar. These claims did not however appear in the French language edition of the same work. In the postscript to the book Le national-socialisme et la tradition indienne  Bouchet claimed that Goodrick-Clarkes's allegations were fake, stating that he had met Savitri Devi only once and considered her to be a crank, adding that he has no personal interest in Nazi mysticism. Bouchet, who claims he is not an Islamophobe, has advocated a closer link between European nationalist groups and Muslim traditionalists.

Christian Bouchet has done a PhD in anthropology in the University Paris Diderot about Aleister Crowley and wrote a lot of books about the extremist engagement in politics and religion.

References

External links

VoxNR website created by Christian Bouchet
Bouchet's written works
Interview with Bouchet

1955 births
Living people
People from Angers
National Rally (France) politicians
Far-right politicians in France
French journalists
Third Position
National Bolsheviks
French nationalists
French male non-fiction writers